Richard Huish College is a further education and sixth-form college in Taunton, Somerset, England. Located on a single site in South Road, about a mile from the centre of Taunton, it offers A-level courses, apprenticeships and vocational courses.

The college has around 2,000 full-time students studying A Levels and BTEC courses, and 500 studying for apprenticeships and professional qualifications. A small number of GCSEs are offered for students wanting to progress to the sixth form.

History
The college is named after Richard Huish, a Taunton wool merchant in the 17th century who invested in property in London. He died in 1615 and his will included an endowment to establish almshouses in Taunton and support local people's university education. Increased income from the properties in the nineteenth century allowed this to be expanded to create both boys and girls schools in Taunton. The boys' school opened in 1875 in what are now the town's Municipal Buildings but by 1891 had moved to East Street. The girls' school opened in The Crescent in 1876 but the charity was unable to support both schools so the girls' school was funded by Bishop Fox's endowment from 1890. It became a sixth form college in 1979.

Campus

The college occupies a site of 8 hectares (20 acres), of which 70% is sports fields, in the south of Taunton. Its buildings, which range in age from 1880 to 2015, take their names from some of the trees that cover the campus. The site is alleged to have previously been an Arboretum.

Over the period 2000–2009, a variety of building projects resulted in;

 Willow, housing the Willow Café (serving both hot and cold drinks and food options alongside a smaller seating area than the Redwood Kitchen), spaces for History, Law, A Level Business, Economics, Modern Foreign Languages and Psychology
 Hawthorn, housing Student Services (otherwise known as H1), Public Services, English and Sports Studies
 Linden, providing a space for tutorials
 Rowan House, housing the offices of various teachers and the Apprenticeship Team

In 2003, the Learning Centre, situated in the heart of the campus, which is named after the science-fiction writer Arthur C. Clarke, a former pupil of Huish's Grammar School, was extended and completely refurbished.

The Learning Centre now contains several study areas including places for both static computers and laptops, a library containing books and DVD's on several different topics, areas for reading and quiet study, a dedicated classroom and a closed off "silent zone" for either quiet study or lessons as required. Various pieces of equipment are also available for "loan", including cameras, laptops and textbooks.

In 2006 the sports dome was opened, which at the time was a ground breaking project for an inflatable dome for sports. Plans were formed to replace this during 2016 with a state of the art sports facility including a viewing area, gym, changing areas and a classroom for sports students. The project was completed in January 2017 and was named the Sycamore Sports Hall.

In 2010, the Juniper Building was opened, providing facilities for students of Photography, Media and Film Studies, Music and Business.

In March 2012, the Cedar Building opened, with a further extension finishing in October of that same year. This building houses classrooms for Childcare and Education, Health and Social Care and Mathematics.

During 2015, a new café area and social space was built, including the first floor Redwood Suite, a multi-use area for dedicated study, lessons, small talks and training sessions. The café area includes a Costa Coffee, the "Huish Kitchen" - offering both hot and cold food options - and a vending machine for drinks. The Redwood Centre was also renovated to house the drama and dance studios.

In September 2020 the Redwood Building was further remodelled, including a remodel of the reception area to help secure the campus with an "airlock" style entrance. The main hall in the building was also renovated to create a theatre, providing both a space for lectures/guest speakers and a performance venue for students complete with stage lighting in order to give Music and Performing Arts students a professional place to rehearse and to showcase their pieces to an audience.

2017 saw the opening of several buildings, one of which is Oak House, providing accommodation to boarding students. Another is the Maple Building, which provides a dedicated space for students of the Arts, ICT, Computing and Graphics at a cost of £3 million.

In December 2018, the Aspen Music Centre was officially opened, providing a state of the art space for Music students. This space includes two recording studios with RedNet Technology, two sound proof live rooms for recording, a Mac suite, an editing and production suite, two specialised classrooms, five practice rooms for instrument lessons, secure instrument storage and a vast library of printed music, equipment and instruments available to loan from the college. In total, the building costed £1.4 million.

In January 2021, the college acquired the Ash Meadows rugby pitch, which is used primarily to teach rugby and to provide a home ground for the college rugby team, the Huish Tigers Rugby Club. This rugby club joins the Huish Tigers family alongside the Huish Tigers Basketball and Rugby Clubs.

Other buildings include;

 Beech, housing the IT Helpdesk and classrooms for Philosophy, Religion and Ethics, Classical Civilisation, Politics, Environmental Science, Geology, Geography and Science Laboratories
 Elmfield House, providing a base for the various support staff of the college including Exams, Finances, Human Resources, International, Marketing and the Estate team

Curriculum
The college offers a large range of A Level and BTEC subjects. There are more than 45 subjects offered at A Level (Level 3). As well as traditional school subjects, many other A Level subjects are offered such as archaeology, classical civilisation, dance, economics, environmental studies, geology, government and politics, law, photography, psychology, sociology and statistics.

An increasing range of BTEC courses (Level 3 vocational courses equivalent to A Levels) are offered. They currently include applied science, business, creative media production, graphic design, health and social care/health sciences, information technology, music production, popular music and sport. A small number of GCSEs are offered for those wanting to progress to the sixth form. The college places a strong emphasis on the breadth of its enrichment activities for students.

The college also delivers apprenticeships and traineeships in the areas of accountancy, medical administration, business and administration, call centre operations, customer service, healthcare, IT user and IT professional, team leading and management, health and social care. At Level 4 and above, the college offers FdA and BA degrees in business and sports development and coaching, and professional courses in Accountancy (AAT, ACCA and CIMA) and Institute of Leadership and Management course (ILM). There are also short courses in computer skills and bespoke training services.

Sport 
Richard Huish College has access to several different sporting facilities, including the Ash Meadows rugby pitch, the playing field and the Sycamore Sports Hall, which comes with an indoor sports hall and a gym which can be accessed through a payment to the college.

Huish Sport runs a sports enrichment programme.  Each year, over 500 students participate in Huish Sport across 19 different sports.

Richard Huish College currently provides several ways to represent the college through sport, including both team and individual sports. The sports included in this are Basketball, Cricket, Cross Country/Athletics, Equestrian, Football, Hockey (for students who own their own horse), Netball, Racquet Sports, Rugby and Volleyball. Many of these teams regularly compete both regionally and on a national level.

There is also the 'Active Huish' scheme which encourages students to take part in sports they previously would not have considered and also provides a more relaxed atmosphere in which to exercise. There are several sports on offer, such as Yoga, Table Tennis, Boccia, 3v3 Basketball, Badminton and Volleyball, alongside the chance to take part in Self Defence courses.

Exam results
The college's A2-Level exam results are as follows:

2003/2004 - 99.3% pass rate
2004/2005 - 99.7% pass rate: A-B: 71%
2005/2006 - 99.8%+ pass rate: A-B: 75%
2006/2007 - 99.2%+ pass rate: A-B: 74%
2007/2008 - 99%+ pass rate: A-B: 55%
2008/2009 - 99%+ pass rate: A-B: 69%
2009/2010 - 99.3% pass rate: A-B: 55.9%
2010/2011 - 99.4% pass rate: A-B: 58.8%
2011/2012 - 99.1% pass rate: A-B: 56.5%
2012/2013 - 99.1% pass rate: A-B: 55.2%
2013/2014 - 98.7% pass rate: A-B: 55%
2014/2015 - 99% pass rate: A-B: 57%

Notable students 
Gareth Andrew, cricketer currently playing for Oxfordshire, former player of Worcestershire, Somerset and Hampshire Cricket Clubs
Andrew Castle, former British number one tennis player and television presenter
Matt Chorley, journalist and broadcaster.
Arthur C. Clarke, author and inventor
Stephen Daldry, film and theatre director. His films include Billy Elliot (2000), The Hours (2002), The Reader (2008) and Extremely Loud & Incredibly Close (2011)
Mike Downey, film producer
Neil Edwards, former Somerset and Nottinghamshire cricketer
Tim Emmett, adventure climber, and one of the world's leading ice climbers.
Carl Gazzard, former County Cricketer for Somerset
William Gibson, professor of ecclesiastical history at Oxford Brookes University
Rebecca Huxtable, producer and co-presenter of The Scott Mills Show on BBC Radio 1
Jack Leach, England international cricketer currently playing for Somerset County Cricket Club
Hannah McKeand, polar explorer who set the record for the fastest journey to the South Pole in 2006
Keith Parsons, cricketer
Michael Parsons, former player of Somerset County Cricket Club
Adam Pengilly, British skeleton racer
Andy Robinson, former head coach of the England national rugby union team
Edward S. Shire, physicist who co-invented the radar proximity fuse, also worked with John Cockroft and Ernest Rutherford
Sam Spurway, former cricketer
Paul Williams, Church of England bishop
Linda Woodhead, professor and academic specialist in religious studies at Lancaster University
Robert Woodman, cricketer currently playing for Devon County Cricket Club

References

External links

Official website

Learning and Skills Beacons
Sixth form colleges in Somerset
Schools in Taunton